AsiaWorld–Expo, a major convention and exhibition facility in Hong Kong, has been one of the busiest venues in the city. The halls in the venue have been used for various entertainment events after its grand opening on 25 December 2005. It houses the AsiaWorld–Arena, the biggest purpose-built indoor seated entertainment arena in Hong Kong with a maximum capacity of 14,000. Viva (stylised in all uppercase), a combination of hall 8 and 10 of the AsiaWorld–Expo which is commonly and simply referred to as AsiaWorld–Expo Hall 10, is a smaller venue that has also been frequently used for concert events.

All events are categorised according to years and venues; in a chronological order.

2000s

2006

2007

2008

2009

2010s

2010

2011

2012

2013

2014

2015

2016

2017

2018

2019

2020s

2020

2021

2022

2023

References

Entertainment events in Hong Kong
Events in Hong Kong
Music events in Hong Kong
Lists of events by venue
AsiaWorld-Expo